Kani Seyyed Shokereh (also Romanized as Kānī Seyyed Shokereh; also known as Kānī-ye Seyyed Shekar) is a village in Tilakuh Rural District, Ziviyeh District, Saqqez County, Kurdistan Province, Iran. At the 2006 census, its population was 55, in 15 families. The village is populated by Kurds.

References 

Towns and villages in Saqqez County
Kurdish settlements in Kurdistan Province